Homicidios (English: Homicides) is a Spanish police procedural TV series which aired in Telecinco in 2011.

Plot
It tells the story of the members of a unit of the Homicide Unit of the National Police, headed by the Chief Inspector Eva Hernandez, with the help of Thomas Soller, a psychologist specializing in Behavioral Pathologies, solve complicated cases.

After a series of crimes, pointing to a serial murderer, and Eva Soller join forces for research. They are symbols of two different views, but complementary, to solve the same case: she embodies traditional research, based on the analysis of physical evidence and the testimony of witnesses and defendants, while intuitive research embodies Soller from the deep human knowledge.

Eva and Soller work on a multidisciplinary research team composed of a cunning criminal inspector tanning in the Anti-Narcotics, Alonso Izquierdo, a disciplined inspector that moves like a fish in water in the Homicide Unit, Pablo Montero, a rookie deputy inspector newly arrival to the unit, María Losada, and a sarcastic forensic loves his job, Susana Rota, all under the supervision of a commissioner of the old school, Andrés Ramos.

Cast
 Eduardo Noriega as Tomas Sóller
 Celia Freijeiro as Eva Hernández
 Carlos García Cortázar as Alonso Izquierdo
 Enrique Berrendero as Pablo Montero 
 Vicky Luengo as María Losada
 Marian Aguilera as Susana Rota
 Esmeralda Moya as Helena Cuevas
 Miguel de Miguel as Carlos García-Aranda
 Mingo Ràfols as Lorenzo Santamaría
 Anna Allen as Patricia Vega
 Mariano Venancio as el comisario Andrés Ramos
 Fernando Soto as Marcelo Salas, "the hunter"
 Valeria Vereau as Rosa Márquez

Episodes and ratings

References

Spanish crime television series
Telecinco network series
2011 Spanish television series debuts
2011 Spanish television series endings
2010s Spanish drama television series